James Gamble (3 April 1803 – 29 April 1891) was an Irish-American soap industrialist. He was the co-founder of Procter & Gamble Company in 1837, along with William Procter.

Early life
James Gamble was born at the Graan near Enniskillen in County Fermanagh, Ireland and went to Portora Royal School.

Gamble emigrated to America with his parents in 1819. He arrived in Cincinnati, Ohio, on a flat boat down the Ohio River destined for Illinois. His family stopped in Cincinnati when he was seized with an illness. Staying in the city, his father established a nursery and Gamble apprenticed as a soap maker. He attended Kenyon College, graduated in 1824, and manufactured soap on his own in 1828.

Procter & Gamble
Gamble went into business with William Procter after they became related by marriage. Gamble's wife Elizabeth Ann Norris was the sister of Procter's wife Olivia Norris. The pair's father-in-law, Alexander Norris, first suggested that the two go into business together in 1837 and consequently Procter & Gamble was born.

Death
Gamble died at his residence in Cincinnati on 29 April 1891 from natural causes. He is interred in Spring Grove Cemetery in Cincinnati.

Procter, who preceded his partner Gamble in death, is also buried at Spring Grove Cemetery.

Family life
Gamble and Elizabeth Ann (Norris) Gamble had ten children, including James Norris Gamble (9 August 1836 – 2 July 1932) who became Vice President of Procter & Gamble and was the chemist who devised the formula for Ivory soap. James Norris Gamble married Margaret Penrose; he died in his sleep on 2 July 1932 in Cincinnati and is interred in Spring Grove Cemetery. Another son, David Gamble, built the Gamble House in Pasadena, California.

Gamble's grandson William married Franzeska Wilhelmina (Fanny) Nast, the daughter of the William Nast, a German-American Methodist preacher. Fanny was the first woman to graduate from German Wallace College in Berea, Ohio.  As one of Cincinnati's biggest proponents of Methodism, Gamble was a prominent member of Westwood Methodist Church and donated money to construct Methodist churches throughout Greater Cincinnati.

Notes

External links 
 History of P&G
 Typhoid Mary and other curiosities in Irish biography

	

1803 births
1891 deaths
British emigrants to the United States
Burials at Spring Grove Cemetery
Irish emigrants to the United States (before 1923)
Kenyon College alumni
Businesspeople from Cincinnati
People from Enniskillen
American people of Scotch-Irish descent
People educated at Portora Royal School
Procter & Gamble people
American company founders
Irish company founders
19th-century American businesspeople
19th-century Irish businesspeople